Yuraq Apachita (Quechua yuraq white, Aymara apachita the place of transit of an important pass in the principal routes of the Andes; name for a stone cairn in the Andes, a little pile of rocks built along the trail in the high mountains,  Hispanicized spelling Yurac Apacheta) is a mountain in the Peruvian Andes, about  high. It is located in the Puno Region, Azángaro Province, San Antón District. Yuraq Apachita lies southwest of the mountain Ichhu Muruq'u and northeast of Hatun Anta. It is situated at the river Tawqani (Taucane).

References

Mountains of Puno Region
Mountains of Peru